In general relativity, optical scalars refer to a set of three scalar functions  (expansion),  (shear) and  (twist/rotation/vorticity) describing the propagation of a geodesic null congruence.

In fact, these three scalars  can be defined for both timelike and null geodesic congruences in an identical spirit, but they are called "optical scalars" only for the null case. Also, it is their tensorial predecessors   that are adopted in tensorial equations, while the scalars  mainly show up in equations written in the language of Newman–Penrose formalism.

Definitions: expansion, shear and twist

For geodesic timelike congruences

where  works as a spatially projecting operator. Use  to project the coordinate covariant derivative  and one obtains the "spatial" auxiliary tensor ,

Specifically for an observer with a geodesic timelike worldline, we have

 is trace-free while  has nonzero trace, . Thus, the symmetric part  can be further rewritten into its trace and trace-free part,

Hence, all in all we have

For geodesic null congruences

Now, consider a geodesic null congruence with tangent vector field . Similar to the timelike situation, we also define

which can be decomposed into

where

Here, "hatted" quantities are utilized to stress that these quantities for null congruences are two-dimensional as opposed to the three-dimensional timelike case. However, if we only discuss null congruences in a paper, the hats can be omitted for simplicity.

Definitions: optical scalars for null congruences
The optical scalars  come straightforwardly from "scalarization" of the tensors  in Eq(9).

The expansion of a geodesic null congruence is defined by (where for clearance we will adopt another standard symbol "" to denote the covariant derivative )

where  represents the induced metric. Also,  and  can be calculated via

Moreover, in the language of Newman–Penrose formalism with the convention , we have

The shear of a geodesic null congruence is defined by

The twist of a geodesic null congruence is defined by

In practice, a geodesic null congruence is usually defined by either its outgoing or ingoing tangent vector field (which are also its null normals).

Applications in decomposing the propagation equations

For a geodesic timelike congruence

   
in terms of the quantities in Eq(6). Moreover, the trace-free, symmetric part of Eq(13) is

Finally, the antisymmetric component of Eq(13) yields

For a geodesic null congruence

A (generic) geodesic null congruence obeys the following propagation equation,

With the definitions summarized in Eq(9), Eq(14) could be rewritten into the following componential equations,

For a restricted geodesic null congruence

For a geodesic null congruence restricted on a null hypersurface, we have

Spin coefficients, Raychaudhuri's equation and optical scalars

For a better understanding of the previous section, we will briefly review the meanings of relevant NP spin coefficients in depicting null congruences. The tensor form of Raychaudhuri's equation governing null flows reads

where  is defined such that . The quantities in Raychaudhuri's equation are related with the spin coefficients via

See also

Raychaudhari equation
Congruence (general relativity)

References

General relativity